Jefe de Jefes ("Boss of Bosses") is the title of a studio album released by Regional Mexican band Los Tigres del Norte. This album became their first number-one set on the Billboard Top Latin Albums, and received a nomination for a Grammy Award for Best Mexican/Mexican-American Album and Regional Mexican Album of the Year at the Lo Nuestro Awards of 1998.

Track listing
The information from Billboard.

Disc 1

Disc 2

Personnel
Eduardo Hernández — arranger, art direction, mixing
James Dean — engineer, mastering, mixing
Arjan McNamara — mastering
Joseph Pope — assistant engineer
Los Tigres del Norte — mixing
Hernán Hernández — band member
Jorge Hernández — band member
Luis Hernández — band member
Oscar Lara — band member
Alan Silfen — photography
John Coulter — graphic design
Erin Flanagan — stylist
Bill Hernández — wardrobe

Chart performance

Sales and certifications

See also
List of number-one Billboard Top Latin Albums of 1997

References

1997 albums
Los Tigres del Norte albums
Spanish-language albums
Fonovisa Records albums